Lin Qingfeng (born 26 January 1989) is a Chinese weightlifter who won a gold medal at the 2012 Summer Olympics in the Men's 69 kg category with a total weight lifted of 344 kg.

References

Chinese male weightlifters
Weightlifters at the 2012 Summer Olympics
Olympic weightlifters of China
1989 births
Living people
Olympic gold medalists for China
Olympic medalists in weightlifting
Weightlifters from Fujian
People from Xiamen
Medalists at the 2012 Summer Olympics
Weightlifters at the 2014 Asian Games
Asian Games medalists in weightlifting
Asian Games gold medalists for China
Medalists at the 2014 Asian Games
21st-century Chinese people